Mother Borzecka can refer to either of the following:
Celine Borzecka, foundress of the Congregation of the Sisters of the Resurrection
Hedwig Borzecka, daughter of Celine and co-foundress of the Congregation of the Sisters of the Resurrection